Noel Twomey (born 1969) is an Irish former Gaelic footballer. At club level he played with Macroom, divisional side Muskerry and was also a member of the Cork senior football team.

Playing career

Twomey first played Gaelic football as a student at the De La Salle College in Macroom, while also lining out at underage levels with the Macroom club. After winning a Cork MFC title in 1986, he progressed to adult level. Twomey was the team's top scorer when Macroom won the Cork IFC title in 1990. He also earned inclusion on the Muskerry divisional team.

Twomey first played for Cork as a member of the minor team that lost back-to back All-Ireland minor finals in 1986 and 1987 when he was also team captain. He immediately progressed onto the under-21 team and was at right corner-forward when Cork beat Galway in the 1989 All-Ireland under-21 final. It was the first of two All-Ireland medals that year as he was also a member of the junior team that beat Warwickshire to win the All-Ireland JFC title. His performances in these grades resulted in Twomey being drafted onto the training panel of the Cork senior football team. During his six-year tenure he lined out in a number of National League games, however, he failed to make it onto the championship panel. Twomey was a member of the Cork team that won the All-Ireland SFC title in 1990, however, as a member of the extended panel he failed to receive a winners' medal.

Coaching career

In retirement from playing, Twomey became involved in team management and coaching. He managed Macroom to the Cork IFC title in 2010.

Honours

Player

Macroom
Cork Intermediate Football Championship: 1990
Cork Minor Football Championship: 1986

Cork
All-Ireland Senior Football Championship: 1990
Munster Senior Football Championship: 1990
All-Ireland Junior Football Championship: 1989
Munster Junior Football Championship: 1989
All-Ireland Under-21 Football Championship: 1989
Munster Under-21 Football Championship: 1989
Munster Minor Football Championship: 1986, 1987 (c)

Manager

Macroom
Cork Intermediate Football Championship: 2010

References

1969 births
Living people
Macroom Gaelic footballers
Muskerry Gaelic footballers
Cork inter-county Gaelic footballers
Gaelic football managers